Justice Marquez may refer to:

Midas Marquez (born 1966), associate justice of the Supreme Court of the Philippines
Monica Márquez (born 1969), associate justice of the Colorado Supreme Court

See also
Judge Marquez (disambiguation)